Dormition Cathedral in the selo of Staraya Ladoga, Volkhovsky District, Leningrad Oblast, Russia is one of the oldest churches of Russia, dating from the second half of the 12th century. It is one of the few surviving pre-Mongol buildings in Russia, and the northernmost one. The cathedral is the katholikon of the female Dormition Monastery, one of the several monasteries in Staraya Ladoga, and is located on the left bank of the Volkhov River. The building was designated an architectural monument of federal significance (#4710028015).

History
Staraya Ladoga was the first seat of Rurik in 862, and, after Rurik moved the seat to Novgorod, remained in the Novgorod Lands. It controlled one of the most important waterways at the time, the Trade route from the Varangians to the Greeks, of which the Volkhov River was a part of. The cathedral was built presumably in the third quarter of the 12th century by Novgorodians. It was rebuilt several times since. In 1761, a side-chapel was built at the northern side of the cathedral, and in 1854-1856 another two were built at the western side, and a bell-tower was erected. In 1925, the cathedral was closed for service. In the 1950s, a complex restoration was performed, the side chapels and the bell-tower were demolished. In 2005, the cathedral was returned to the Russian Orthodox Church.

Architecture
The cathedral is made of plinthite and has a very simple composition. The western wall has two relief crosses.

Frescoes
In the 12th century, the interior of the church was covered by frescoes. The frescoes seem to be close in style to those in Polotsk and in Veliky Novgorod.

References

Buildings and structures in Leningrad Oblast
Tourist attractions in Leningrad Oblast
Medieval Eastern Orthodox church buildings in Russia
Staraya Ladoga
Russian Orthodox cathedrals in Russia
Cultural heritage monuments of federal significance in Leningrad Oblast